Prince Charles Iworah (born March 11, 1993) is an American football cornerback who is currently a free agent. He played college football at Western Kentucky, and was drafted by the San Francisco 49ers in the seventh round of the 2016 NFL Draft.

In his career, he has also been a member of the Kansas City Chiefs, Washington Redskins, Atlanta Falcons, Team 9 of the XFL, Montreal Allouettes of the Canadian Football League (CFL), and the Pittsburgh Maulers of the United States Football League (USFL).

High school career
Iworah attended Father Ryan High School where he was an All-State selection as running back during his senior season in 2010. For that season, he rushed 182 times for 1,096 yards and 11 touchdowns.

College career
Iworah attended Western Kentucky. While at Western Kentucky, he joined the Hilltoppers football team during the season and converted to cornerback. As a redshirt freshman in 2012, he appeared in just one game, during which he recorded his first two career tackles. As a redshirt sophomore in 2013, he appeared in 10 games. He recorded 10 tackles while playing primarily as a back-up defensive back and on special teams. As a redshirt junior in 2014, he started all 13 games at cornerback. He recorded 37 tackles, 2.5 tackles-for-loss, one interception and one forced fumble. As a redshirt senior in 2015, he appeared in 13 games. He recorded 42 tackles, one tackle-for-loss, 11 passes defended, and four interceptions.

Professional career

San Francisco 49ers
Iworah was drafted by the San Francisco 49ers in the seventh round (249th overall) of the 2016 NFL Draft. On September 3, 2016, he was released by the 49ers as part of final roster cuts and was signed to the practice squad the next day. On December 20, 2016, he was promoted to the active roster.

On September 1, 2017, Iworah was waived/injured by the 49ers and placed on injured reserve. He was released on December 23, 2017.

Kansas City Chiefs
On January 4, 2018, Iworah signed a reserve/future contract with the Kansas City Chiefs, but was waived on May 8, 2018.

Washington Redskins
Iworah signed with the Washington Redskins on July 25, 2018. On September 1, 2018, he was waived for final roster cuts before the start of the 2018 season.

Atlanta Falcons
On September 13, 2018, Iworah was signed to the Atlanta Falcons' practice squad. He was released on September 19, 2018.

Montreal Alouettes
After spending time on the XFL's Team 9 practice squad in 2020, Iworah signed with the Montreal Alouettes of the CFL on April 7, 2021. He was placed on the suspended list on May 20, 2021, in order to play with the Conquerors of The Spring League in May 2021.

Pittsburgh Maulers
On May 19, 2022, Iworah signed with the Pittsburgh Maulers of the United States Football League. He was released on February 11, 2023.

References

External links
 Western Kentucky Hilltoppers bio
 San Francisco 49ers bio

Living people
1993 births
American football cornerbacks
Players of American football from Nashville, Tennessee
Western Kentucky Hilltoppers football players
San Francisco 49ers players
Kansas City Chiefs players
Washington Redskins players
Atlanta Falcons players
Team 9 players
Montreal Alouettes players
The Spring League players
Pittsburgh Maulers (2022) players